Bill Mustos is a Canadian television executive and lawyer. He is the founder, president and executive producer through Avamar Entertainment of Flashpoint. Mustos' has been involved in the Canadian film and television industry for decades.

External links 
 CTV.ca biography
 

Canadian television producers
Year of birth missing (living people)
Living people
Place of birth missing (living people)